Paulo Jorge Rebelo Duarte (born 6 April 1969) is a Portuguese retired footballer who played as a central defender, and is the current manager of the Togo national team.

In a 17-year senior career, he amassed Primeira Liga totals of 238 matches and eight goals over 12 seasons, representing mainly União de Leiria. He became a manager in 2006, also working with that club and later being in charge of the Burkina Faso, Gabon and Togo national teams.

Playing career
Duarte was born in Massarelos, Porto District. After playing youth football for local Boavista F.C. and starting out as a senior at C.F. União de Coimbra, he signed for U.D. Leiria in 1988, also in the second division.

Duarte then spent two seasons apiece for S.C. Salgueiros and C.S. Marítimo, making his Primeira Liga debut with the former and appearing in a total of 84 league games both clubs combined. Subsequently, he returned to Leiria who now competed in the Portuguese top flight, retiring after almost one decade at the age of 34 and acting as first choice in four of those campaigns (in 2001–02, as the team qualified for the UEFA Intertoto Cup, he was managed by young José Mourinho).

Coaching career
After his retirement, Duarte immediately began his managerial career, staying with his last club Leiria as assistant. In the tenth round of 2006–07's top division he was named coach of the first team, eventually helping them finish seventh.

In late 2007, Duarte left Leiria and, a couple of months later, was appointed manager of Burkina Faso. On 2 June 2009, however, he was signed by France's Le Mans Union Club 72 on a two-year contract while still working with the national side.

Duarte was fired by Le Mans on 8 December 2009, becoming the first Ligue 1 manager casualty in the season, but still was on the bench for Burkina Faso's 2010 Africa Cup of Nations campaign, exiting in the group stage after one draw and one loss (the team was in Togo's group). On 17 February 2012, following three matches and as many losses at the 2012 Africa Cup of Nations, he was dismissed.

On 29 April 2012, Duarte was appointed interim coach of the Gabon national team. He was sacked on 23 September of the following year, after failing to qualify the country for both the 2013 Africa Cup of Nations and the 2014 FIFA World Cup.

In late December 2015, after a brief club spell with Tunisia's CS Sfaxien, Duarte was again named manager of Burkina Faso. He led the latter to the third place at the 2017 Africa Cup of Nations, after a 1–0 win against Ghana in Port-Gentil. 

On 24 July 2019, as the team did not make it to the 2019 Africa Cup of Nations finals, the Burkinabé Football Federation decided to terminate Duarte's contract. In September 2020, he was announced as the new head coach of Angolan side C.D. Primeiro de Agosto.

Duarte became manager of Togo in May 2021, following the departure of Claude Le Roy. As a result of his commitments to Primeiro de Agosto the deal was only made effective in August, with Jonas Komla acting as caretaker until his arrival.

Player eligibility controversy
Duarte selected players to play for the Burkina Faso national team who he believed were eligible to play for the nation after they married Burkinabé women. Namibia complained about the fielding of Cameroonian Herve Xavier Zengue in two 2012 AFCON qualifying games, stating that the player was not eligible under FIFA's statutes.

Duarte also chose to play Zengue after the complaint was received by CAF, fielding him alongside Ghanaian-born Nii Plange in a 0–3 loss with South Africa in an August 2011 friendly.

References

External links

1969 births
Living people
Footballers from Porto
Portuguese footballers
Association football defenders
Primeira Liga players
Liga Portugal 2 players
Boavista F.C. players
U.D. Leiria players
S.C. Salgueiros players
C.S. Marítimo players
Portuguese football managers
Primeira Liga managers
U.D. Leiria managers
Ligue 1 managers
Le Mans FC managers
Tunisian Ligue Professionnelle 1 managers
CS Sfaxien managers
C.D. Primeiro de Agosto managers
Burkina Faso national football team managers
Gabon national football team managers
Togo national football team managers
2010 Africa Cup of Nations managers
2012 Africa Cup of Nations managers
2017 Africa Cup of Nations managers
Portuguese expatriate football managers
Expatriate football managers in Burkina Faso
Expatriate football managers in France
Expatriate football managers in Gabon
Expatriate football managers in Tunisia
Expatriate football managers in Angola
Expatriate football managers in Togo
Portuguese expatriate sportspeople in France
Portuguese expatriate sportspeople in Gabon
Portuguese expatriate sportspeople in Tunisia
Portuguese expatriate sportspeople in Angola